Adineta is a genus of rotifers belonging to the family Adinetidae.

The species of this genus are found in Europe, Northern America and Southernmost Southern Hemisphere.

Species 

Species:

Adineta acuticornis 
Adineta barbata 
Adineta bartosi 
Adineta beysunae 
Adineta coatsi 
Adineta cuneata 
Adineta editae 
Adineta elongata 
Adineta emsliei 
Adineta fontanetoi 
Adineta glauca 
Adineta gracilis 
Adineta grandis 
Adineta longicornis 
Adineta oculata 
Adineta ricciae 
Adineta steineri 
Adineta tuberculosa 
Adineta vaga 
Adineta vaga major 
Adineta vaga minor 
Adineta vaga rhomboidea 
Adineta vaga tenuicornis 
Adineta vaga vaga

References

Bdelloidea
Rotifer genera